The Johnson-Neel House is a private historic house near Mooresville, North Carolina.  It was listed on the National Register of Historic Places in 1975.

It apparently was built in the 1826-1835 period, probably before 1830.  Its construction is attributed to master builder Jacob Stirewalt.  Features include a Federal-style stairway including tulip brackets.  It also has a fireplace mantel that is very similar to one at Mill Hill, Stirewalt's home in Concord (also NRHP-listed).

References

 its dope

Houses on the National Register of Historic Places in North Carolina
Houses completed in 1830
Houses in Iredell County, North Carolina
Plantation houses in North Carolina
National Register of Historic Places in Iredell County, North Carolina
1830 establishments in North Carolina